In category theory, a Lawvere theory (named after American mathematician William Lawvere) is a category that can be considered a categorical counterpart of the notion of an equational theory.

Definition

Let  be a skeleton of the category FinSet of finite sets and functions. Formally, a Lawvere theory consists of a small category L with (strictly associative) finite products and a strict identity-on-objects functor  preserving finite products.

A model of a Lawvere theory in a category C with finite products is a finite-product preserving functor .  A morphism of models    where M and N are models of L is a natural transformation of functors.

Category of Lawvere theories

A map between Lawvere theories (L, I) and (L′, I′) is a finite-product preserving functor that commutes with I and I′. Such a map is commonly seen as an interpretation of (L, I) in (L′, I′).

Lawvere theories together with maps between them form the category Law.

Variations
Variations include multisorted (or multityped) Lawvere theory, infinitary Lawvere theory, and finite-product theory.

See also 
 Algebraic theory
 Clone (algebra)
 Monad (category theory)

Notes

References
 
 

Categorical logic